Tal Rabin (Hebrew: טל רבין, born 1962) is a computer scientist and Professor of Computer and Information Science at the University of Pennsylvania. She was previously the head of Research at the Algorand Foundation and the head of the cryptography research group at IBM's Thomas J. Watson Research Center.

Biography
Tal Rabin was born in Massachusetts and grew up in Jerusalem, Israel. As a child, she enjoyed solving riddles and playing strategic games. Her father, Michael Rabin, is a celebrated computer scientist who is responsible for many breakthroughs in the fields of computability and cryptography. She and her father have co-authored a paper together. She is the mother of two daughters.

Career

In 1986, she received her BSc from the Hebrew University of Jerusalem. She continued her studies for her MSc (1988) and PhD (1994) degrees in the Hebrew University under the supervision of prof. Michael Ben Or. Between the years 1994–1996 she was an NSF Postdoctoral Fellow at MIT. She later joined the cryptography group at the Thomas J. Watson Research Center, and became head of the group in 1997. In 2020, she joined the University of Pennsylvania as a professor of Computer and Information Science.

Rabin's research focuses on cryptography and network security, specifically the design of efficient and secure encryption algorithms. In addition, she studies secure distributed protocols and the theoretical foundations of cryptography, as well as number theory and the theory of algorithms and distributed systems. She has co-authored over 100 papers. She has also registered five patents in the US.
Her research focuses on making communications over the internet more secure. Her most cited works in this field focus on the design of digital signature schemes, which are widely used, among other applications, in protocols for secure web communication. Another focus is on a different scheme of encrypted communications called secret sharing. A sizable part of her work on these subjects is done in collaboration with Rosario Gennaro and Hugo Krawczyk.

Rabin has been on the committees of many leading cryptography conferences, including TCC, Crypto, PKC and Eurocrypt. She was a council member of the Computing Community Consortium (2013–2016), a member of the executive committee of SIGACT (2012–2015), and a member of the editorial board of the Journal of Cryptology.
Rabin is a founder and organizer of the Women in Theory Workshop, a biennial event for graduate students in theoretical computer science.
She is also involved in activities to make the field of encryption more accessible to the general public. In 2011 she took part in the World Science Festival, a popular science event held in New York City. In 2014, she took part in a similar event, the WNYC Science Fair.

Awards

2019: The RSA Award for Excellence in Mathematics.

2018: One of America's Top 50 Women In Tech by Forbes.

2017: ACM Fellow

2016: Fellow of the American Academy of Arts and Sciences (AAAS).

2015: IACR Fellow (International Association for Cryptologic Research).

2014: Woman of Vision for innovation by the Anita Borg Institute.

2014: One of the 22 most powerful women engineers in the world by Business Insider.

References

External links
 Tal Rabin's homepage, on the IBM research website.
 A blog post about Tal Rabin in the blog A Smarter Planet.
 a TEDx talk given by Tal Rabin. 
 ABIE Women of Vision Award Acceptance Speech.

Living people
Hebrew University of Jerusalem School of Computer Science & Engineering alumni
Israeli women computer scientists
Israeli computer scientists
Israeli cryptographers
Modern cryptographers
Fellows of the American Academy of Arts and Sciences
Fellows of the Association for Computing Machinery
IBM Research computer scientists
1962 births